Aremfoxia is a monotypic genus of clearwing (ithomiine) butterflies in the brush-footed butterfly family, Nymphalidae. The genus was named by Herman G. Real in 1971. Its one species, Aremfoxia ferra, was described by Richard Haensch in 1909.

References 

Ithomiini
Nymphalidae of South America
Nymphalidae genera